WOOL-LP (100.1 FM, "Black Sheep Radio") was a radio station broadcasting a Variety music format. Licensed to Bellows Falls, Vermont, United States, the station was owned by Great Falls Community Broadcasting Company. WOOL-LP ceased broadcast in February 2014, to implement a Class A noncommercial educational license granted by the Federal Communications Commission. The successor station, WOOL, began broadcasting on March 9, 2014 at 91.5 FM. WOOL-LP was (and the current WOOL remains) a community radio station.

References

External links
 Black Sheep Radio Online
 

OOL-LP
OOL-LP
Bellows Falls, Vermont
Radio stations established in 2005
2005 establishments in Vermont
Radio stations disestablished in 2014
Defunct radio stations in the United States
2014 disestablishments in Vermont
OOL-LP